The 1957–58 Greek Football Cup was the 16th edition of the Greek Football Cup. The competition culminated with the Greek Cup Final, held at Karaiskakis Stadium, on 30 July 1958. The match was contested by Olympiacos and Doxa Drama, with Olympiacos winning by 5–1.

Calendar
From Round of 32 onwards:

Knockout phase
In the knockout phase, teams play against each other over a single match. If the match ends up as a draw, extra time will be played and if the match remains a draw a replay match is set at the home of the guest team which the extra time rule stands as well. If a winner doesn't occur after the replay match the winner emerges by a flip of a coin.

Bracket

Round of 16

|| colspan="2" rowspan="4" 

|| colspan="2" rowspan="3" 

|}

* The match was suspended at the 43rd minute in expense of Niki Volos while the score was 1–2. Awarded to Iraklis.

Quarter-finals

|}

* Withdrawn.

Semi-finals

||colspan="2" 

|}

Final

The 16th Greek Cup Final was played at the Karaiskakis Stadium.

References

External links
Greek Cup 1957-58 at RSSSF

Greek Football Cup seasons
Greek Cup
Cup